Jason Heath Sehorn (born April 15, 1971) is a former American football cornerback who played professionally in the National Football League (NFL) for the New York Giants from 1994 to 2002 and St. Louis Rams in 2003.  He played college football at the University of Southern California (USC).

Early years
Sehorn was born in Sacramento, California. He played only one year of high school football at Mount Shasta High School in Mount Shasta, California.

College career
Sehorn played his first two years of college football at Shasta College, a junior college in Redding, California, where he was a standout wide receiver, kick returner and punt returner. He then played two years at the University of Southern California, where he was moved to safety due to an abundance of talent at wide receiver.

Professional career

Sehorn was drafted in the second round of the 1994 NFL Draft by the New York Giants,
and spent most of his career playing cornerback for them.

After back-to-back successful seasons in 1996–97, Sehorn suffered a debilitating knee injury, tearing his anterior cruciate (ACL) and medial collateral ligaments (MCL) while returning the opening kickoff in a 1998 preseason game against the New York Jets. Though Sehorn returned the next season, his speed was diminished. Still, he started 73 games for the Giants at cornerback in six seasons played from 1996 to 2002. He represented the Giants in Super Bowl XXXV.

The Giants released Sehorn on March 7, 2003, and in May of that year he signed with the St. Louis Rams as a safety.   He missed the first six games of the season with a broken foot, but played in the last ten. The next year, his contract with the Rams was terminated after he failed a physical examination before the start of the 2004 season.

Sehorn was signed by the Chicago Cubs after just one season of playing American Legion Baseball following his senior year of high school. An outfielder, Sehorn failed to produce as a hitter, batting just .184 in 49 games in 1990 for the rookie league Huntington Cubs.

Sehorn played a firefighter for one episode on the NBC show, Third Watch, in which his character is killed in a warehouse blaze.

Sehorn is now the Director of Communications at the Hendrick Automotive Group in Charlotte, NC, an automotive retailer in the United States. 

In 2005, Sehorn joined Fox Sports Net, where he was a panelist on their Sunday NFL pregame show.

Sehorn participated in ABC's Superstars competition during the NFL offseason. As a testament to his athleticism, he won the competition three consecutive years from 1998 to 2000.

Sehorn is also a college football analyst for ESPNU. He joined the network in 2011 as the in-studio analyst for Thursday and Saturday night games on ESPNU.

Personal life
Sehorn was briefly married to former CNN correspondent Whitney Casey from February 14, 1998 until their divorce in 1999. His marriage to actress Angie Harmon is well known due to his unusual and public proposal. During one of Harmon's appearances on The Tonight Show with Jay Leno, Sehorn (with the assistance of host Jay Leno) hid backstage and surprised Harmon by getting on one knee and asking for her hand in marriage in front of a live studio audience and millions more watching on television. They were married on June 9, 2001. They have three daughters: Finley, born October 14, 2003; Avery, born June 22, 2005; and Emery, born December 18, 2008 Both publicly support the Republican Party. The couple announced in November 2014 that they were separating after 13 years of marriage, and divorced in December 2015. Sehorn remarried, to Meghann Gunderman, in 2017.

On January 19, 1999, Sehorn's high school jersey #1 was retired by his alma mater, Mt. Shasta High School, in a ceremony hosted by his longtime friend, mentor, and former coach, Joe Blevins. The ceremony aired on local cable television.

References

External links
 
 
 
 
 Shasta County Sports Hall of Fame Electees

1971 births
Living people
American football cornerbacks
American football safeties
Huntington Cubs players
New York Giants players
St. Louis Rams players
USC Trojans football players
Shasta Knights football players
People from Mount Shasta, California
People from Teaneck, New Jersey
Players of American football from Sacramento, California
California Republicans